A MIDIjet Pro is a long-range, wireless MIDI system created in 2005 by Artisan Classic Organ Inc. Its predecessor (no longer in production) was a short-range wireless MIDI system called MIDIjet. It connects any two pieces of MIDI equipment wirelessly using standard 5-pin MIDI connectors.

The company originally conceived the MIDIjet in order to be able to voice pipe organs from a MIDI controller keyboard from anywhere in the sanctuary or auditorium. When they needed a system that was reliable farther away than the MIDIjet's 30 ft, they developed the MIDIjet Pro which has a maximum range of 500 ft.

It operates on the worldwide, license-free, 2.4 GHz band. It has 31 separate channels. Up to 31 can be used simultaneously in the same environment. Each pair is bound together so that they can only be used with each other.

Typical applications 
It was first introduced at the 2005 NAMM show. Its first production unit was sold to Michael Brecker. It is now used by touring professionals worldwide.
Zen Riffer
Zendrum percussion controllers
MIDI keyboards
Roland AX-7 and Roland AX-1
EWI Electronic Wind Controllers
Nyle Steiner's EVI
Eliminating studio or stage cables
MIDI switching equipment
Yamaha Disklavier player pianos

External links
  Available in the United States from Patchman Music
  http://midijet.com/index.php/store
  http://midijet.com/index.php/renowned-users

MIDI